Toe to Toe are an Australian hardcore band from Sydney, New South Wales, Australia. The band was most prominent in the Australian hardcore scene during the 1990s, touring and recording less frequently by the 2000s. They have been described as "one of the best hardcore outfits ever to grace the planet" by Punknews.org.

Influence and style
Toe to Toe's stated aim is "to reintroduce the sounds and ethics of 80's hardcore punk", having been influenced by the emergence of the Washington, D.C. hardcore band Bad Brains, Portland hardcore band Poison Idea and later, New York hardcore bands such as Agnostic Front and Sick of it All. They have tried to distance themselves from the metal and pop aspects of punk. The band's name itself, including much of their lyrical content and album artwork reference boxing terms to match the aggressive musical style.

History
Toe to Toe formed in 1992 by vocalist and Resist Records founder, Scotty Mac, who remains the band's only original member. Described by Missing Link Records as the "mainstays of the Sydney hardcore scene", the band has seen numerous line-up changes, released several recordings and have possibly been one of the only Australian hardcore acts to have received mainstream acknowledgment in the country, playing festivals such as Livid, Homebake and the Vans Warped Tours. They have also done national tours of Japan, Europe and America and have played with internationally renowned hardcore acts such as Agnostic Front, the Dropkick Murphys, and Madball. Political artist and activist, Azlan McLennan, described the band as superior to their US influences, citing Scott Mac's  stance against racism.

Members
As of 2016, the band's line-up consists of:
 Vocals: Scotty Mac
 Guitars: Nick Rakebrandt
 Drums: Ant Deitz
 Bass: Adam Check

2001-2004:
Vocals: Scotty Mac
Lead guitar: Pete Bursky
Rhythm guitar: Will Webber 
Bass: Neil 'Beans' Ryan
Drums: Ben 'Mook' Mukenshnabl

2000-2001:
Vocals: Scotty Mac
Guitar: Will Webber 
Bass: Neil 'Beans' Ryan
Drums: Matt 'Spider' Lodge (deceased)

Discography

See also
Resist Records
Trial & Error Records

References

External links
 Toe to Toe on MySpace

Australian hardcore punk groups
Musical groups established in 1992